Simon Chase is a British sound editor. He was nominated for an Academy Award in the category Best Sound for the film Belfast.

Selected filmography 
 Belfast (2021; co-nominated with Denise Yarde, James Mather and Niv Adiri)

References

External links 

Living people
Place of birth missing (living people)
Year of birth missing (living people)
British sound editors